Miguel Grinberg (18 August 1937 – 4 March 2022) was an Argentine writer, poet, and journalist. He died on 4 March 2022, at the age of 84.

References

1937 births
2022 deaths
Argentine journalists
Argentine poets
Argentine translators
Argentine writers
Academic staff of the National University of La Plata
People from Buenos Aires